Globoka ( or ) is a settlement in the hills above the right bank of the Ščavnica River in the Municipality of Ljutomer in northeastern Slovenia, adjacent to the border with Croatia. The area traditionally belonged to the Zala County in the Kingdom of Hungary and is now included in the Mura Statistical Region.

There is a Neo-Gothic chapel in the settlement that is dedicated to Saint Mary of the Angels. It was built in 1896.

References

External links
Globoka on Geopedia

Populated places in the Municipality of Ljutomer